Go into Exile is the fifth album by Missing Foundation, released in 1992 by Restless Records.

Track listing

Personnel 
Adapted from Go into Exile liner notes.

Missing Foundation
Mark Ashwill – drums-metal
Chris Egan – drums, photography
Florian Langmaack – drums
Peter Missing – drums-metal-vocals
adam nodleman-bass
Mark Laramie (Laramee) – Bass and Guitar

Production and additional personnel
Missing Foundation – production
Jim Waters – production

Release history

References

External links 
 Go into Exile at Discogs (list of releases)

1992 albums
Missing Foundation albums
Restless Records albums